Spencer Haven (1868–1938) was an American politician and the Attorney General of Wisconsin.

Biography
Haven was born in Floyd, Iowa on 16 January 1868. He graduated in 1890 with a B.S. degree from Iowa State College. He attended law school at University of Wisconsin-Madison, and was admitted to the state bar in 1895. 

Haven was Attorney General from 1918 to 1919. Previously, he had been a member of the Republican State Central Committee from 1905 to 1906.

Haven died on 20 December 1938.

References

Wisconsin Attorneys General
Wisconsin Republicans
Iowa State University alumni
University of Wisconsin Law School alumni
People from Floyd County, Iowa
1868 births
1938 deaths